The four-year mandate of Mayor of Montreal coincides with that of the Montreal City Council.

Montreal municipal elections 
 1966 Montreal municipal election 
 1970 Montreal municipal election
 1974 Montreal municipal election 
 1978 Montreal municipal election
 1982 Montreal municipal election 
 1986 Montreal municipal election
 1990 Montreal municipal election 
 1994 Montreal municipal election
 1998 Montreal municipal election 
 2001 Montreal municipal election
 2005 Montreal municipal election 
 2009 Montreal municipal election
 2013 Montreal municipal election
 2017 Montreal municipal election
 2021 Montreal municipal election

Montreal City Council  

The councillors are elected by direct universal suffrage in a majority system and have a mandate of four years.

Mayor of Montreal  

The Mayor is elected by direct universal suffrage in a majority system. The Mayor’s four-year mandate coincides with that of the Montreal City Council.

Borough Councils  

The city of Montreal is divided into 19 boroughs (in French, arrondissements), each with a mayor and council.

Leader of the Official Opposition

See also
 Municipal elections in Canada 
 Montreal City Hall 
 Timeline of Montreal history

References

External links 
 City of Montreal

Municipal government of Montreal
History of Montreal
Municipal elections